Lesya Anatolievna Makhno (born 4 September 1981) is a Russian volleyball player. She was a member of the national team that won the gold medal at the 2010 World Championship.

References

External links
 Lesya Makhno:  In Japan we were confident in our abilities

1981 births
Living people
Ukrainian emigrants to Russia
People from Poltava Oblast
Russian women's volleyball players